Maverick Jetpants in the City of Quality is a novel by American author Bill Peters, published on October 9, 2012 by Black Balloon Publishing.

Synopsis
Set in Rochester, New York in 1999, Maverick Jetpants in the City of Quality revolves around narrator Nathan Gray coming to terms with adulthood while trying to catch an arsonist who is burning down his hometown. Nate struggles with securing full-time employment and forming meaningful relationships with family and romantic interests as his childhood friend, Necro, grows distant, becoming involved with local Neo-Nazis and possibly being responsible for the mysterious fires.

The story is told from Nate's point of view and in the idiosyncratic language he uses with his friends — a mixture of colloquialisms and inside jokes, which offer insight into the characters' histories, hopes and fears.

Reception
The book was an editor's choice in The New York Times Sunday Book Review, which claimed "... Bill Peters belongs in the ranks of serious literary artists." The book was also praised by Publishers Weekly as "by turns funny and moving ... richly captures life in a decaying American city."

References

2012 American novels
Black Balloon Publishing books
Novels set in New York (state)
Rochester, New York in fiction